Philip de' Medici (20 May 1577 – 29 March 1582) was the youngest child of Francesco I de' Medici and Joanna of Austria. He was the heir to the Tuscan throne.

Life
Philip received his name in honour of the King Philip II of Spain. The birth was celebrated with great joy by all the court, because thus was secured the succession of the Grand Duchy for another generation and eliminated all the hopes of Bianca Cappello (his father's mistress) to have her son Antonio become heir of Tuscany. Philip became Grand Prince of Tuscany.

When he was not quite eleven months old, his mother died in an accident falling down the stairs of the ducal apartments while heavily pregnant. His father then married Bianca Cappello. Philip was one of seven children, but only two of the children survived till  adulthood, Eleonora de' Medici and Marie de' Medici (who became queen consort of France). He had another sister Anna who died aged fourteen. Philip died on 29 March 1582; he was four years old, and suffered from hydrocephalus: when his skull was opened, the equivalent of about a glass of fluid came out. Recent study of his remains have confirmed the diagnosis.

Ancestry

References

1577 births
1582 deaths
Filippo
Nobility from Florence
16th-century Italian nobility
Filippo
Burials at San Lorenzo, Florence
Heirs apparent who never acceded
People with hydrocephalus
Royalty and nobility with disabilities
Sons of monarchs
Royalty and nobility who died as children

br:Filippo de' Medici